Narail Government High School (নড়াইল সরকারী উচ্চ বিদ্যালয়) is the leading high school in the Narail district of Bangladesh. In 1903, a lawyer Gurudas Bhattacharya founded the "Narail English High School". Later it used to be called as "Narail Subdivision High School". At the beginning, there were only arts related subjects. In 6th decade of 20th century when the school was introduced to science and business classes then it was named "Narail Subdivision Multilateral High School". On 1 May 1968, the school was approved by the Govt. as a Govt. school. In 1984 when Narail became a district from subdivision, then the name of the school was replaced by Narail Govt. High School. The school is also known as the "Boys School". The school is situated in 7.33-acre land.

On 21 February 1938, the district judge T.M. Ellis visited the school and reported, "I visited the school this afternoon and was taken round the classes by the Headmaster. I was very pleased with what I saw. The boys read English well. I think the School deserves the extra grant it is seeking".
Famous cricket player Mashrafe Mortaza studied in this school.

Info 
EIIN: 118449

School Code: 6500

Center Code: 320

Teachers 
Bishnupodo Biswas is the headmaster of Narail Govt. High School. There are many well qualified teachers in our school. Idris Ahmmed is the assistant headmaster of morning shift and Narayon Chandra Devnath is the assistant headmaster of afternoon shift. Some of the assistant teachers are-
 Prodesh Kumar Mollick (Biology).
 Sobuj Kumar Saha (Physics).
 Abdul Jalil (English).
 Zillur Rahman (Math).
 B.M. Khalid Hasan (English).
 Amol Kanti Nag (Bangla).
 Nazrul Islam (English).
 Shoktipodo Biswas (Math).
 Md. Mizanur Rahman (Bangla).
 Shantunu Roy (Physics).
 Nitish Chandra Joddar (Biology).
 Bipul Kumar Sen (Social Science)
 Md. Jahangir Alam (Commerce).
 Md. Monjur Hasan (Commerce).

Notable students
 Mashrafe Bin Mortaza, Ex Captain, Bangladesh National Cricket Team

References
 Ref. Book: Loreal hothe Narail Page no: 352
 Ref. Editor: Md. Alimujjaman Soyket (SSC: 2014)
 Ref. Editor: Sakib Rafsan (SSC: 2024)
 Ref. Editor: Shahriar Ibne Azam (SSC: 2000)

High schools in Bangladesh
1903 establishments in India